Professional baseball leagues, amateur-baseball organizations, sportswriting associations, and other groups confer awards on various baseball teams, players, managers, coaches, executives, broadcasters, writers, and other baseball-related people for excellence in achievement, sportsmanship, and community involvement.

International

World Baseball Softball Confederation (WBSC)

Baseball Division 

Senior Athlete of the Year
Junior Athlete of the Year
Coach of the Year
Umpire of the Year
Member Federation Executive of the Year

World

Adult baseball 
WBSC Baseball World Rankings (men's)
WBSC Baseball World Rankings (women's)
WBSC Premier12 championship (national teams)
World Baseball Classic championship trophy (national teams)
World Baseball Classic Most Valuable Player
World Baseball Classic All–WBC team
23U Baseball World Cup (WBSC) (national teams; under 23)
Baseball World Cup championship (originally called the Amateur World Series, from 1938 to 1986) 
Baseball World Cup Most Valuable Player
Baseball World Cup All-Star Team and tournament awards
Women's Baseball World Cup championship (national teams)
Women's Baseball World Cup All-Star team
Women's Baseball World Series 
Intercontinental Cup championship 
World Port Tournament championship
Haarlem Baseball Week championship
Haarlem Baseball Week tournament awards (Best Pitcher, Best Hitter, Best Defending Player, Home Run King, Most Valuable Player, Most Popular Player, Press Award)
World Baseball Challenge tournament championship
Grand Forks International Tournament championship
Baseball at the Summer Olympics
List of Olympic medalists in baseball
Baseball at the Summer Universiade
World University Baseball Championship

Youth baseball 
18U Baseball World Cup (WBSC) (national teams; under 18)
15U Baseball World Cup (WBSC) (national teams; under 15)
12U Baseball World Cup (WBSC) (national teams; under 12)
Big League World Series championship (community teams; ages 16–18) (discontinued after 2016)
 Big League World Series international-bracket championship (discontinued after 2016)
 Big League World Series international regional championships (discontinued after 2016)
Senior League World Series championship (community teams; ages 14–16)
 Senior League World Series international regional championships
Junior League World Series championship (community teams; ages 13–15)
Junior League World Series international-bracket championship
Junior League World Series international regional championships
Intermediate League World Series championship (community teams; ages 11–13)
Intermediate League World Series international-bracket championship
Intermediate League World Series international regional championships
Little League World Series championship (community teams; ages 11–13)
Little League World Series international-bracket championship (1976–present)
Little League World Series international regional championships:
For U.S. regional champions, see #Little League Baseball
Former international regions: Europe Region (1960–2000), Europe Region (2001–2003), Europe, Middle East, and Africa (EMEA) Region (2004–2007), Transatlantic Region (2001–2007), Europe Region (2008–2012), Middle East-Africa Region (2008–2012), Far East Region (1962–2000), Asia Region (2001–2006), Pacific Region (2001–2006), Asia-Pacific Region (2007–2012)
Canada Region championship
Mexico Region championship
Caribbean Region championship
Latin America Region championship
Japan Region championship
Asia-Pacific and Middle East Region championship
Europe and Africa Region championship
Australia Region championship
Palomino League World Series championship (community teams; ages 17–19)
Colt League World Series championship (community teams; ages 15–16)
Pony League World Series championship (community teams; ages 13–14)
Pony-13 League World Series championship (community teams; age 13)
Bronco League World Series championship (community teams; ages 11–12)
Bronco-11 League World Series championship (community teams; age 11)
Mustang League World Series championship (community teams; ages 9–10)
 Cal Ripken Major/70 World Series championship (community teams; ages 11–12)
 Cal Ripken Major/60 World Series championship (community teams; ages 11–12)

Africa 

Africa Cup Baseball Championship
Baseball at the African Games
Big League World Series – Europe–Africa Region championship (community teams; ages 16–18) (discontinued in 2016)
Senior League World Series – Europe–Africa Region championship (community teams; ages 14–16)
Junior League World Series – Europe–Africa Region championship (community teams; ages 13–15)
Intermediate League World Series – Europe–Africa Region championship (community teams;ages 11–13)
Little League – Europe, Middle East & Africa Region championship (2004–2007) (community teams; ages 11–13)
Little League – Middle East–Africa Region championship (2008–2012) (community teams; ages 11–13)
Little League World Series – Europe and Africa Region championship (2013 – ) (community teams; ages 11–13)

Americas 

 See also Latino Baseball Hall of Fame
Caribbean Series championship (club teams)
Caribbean Series Most Valuable Player
Baseball at the Central American and Caribbean Games
Baseball at the Pan American Games (men's and women's)
Baseball at the South American Games
Copa America de Beisbol (Central & South America qualifier for 2009 Baseball World Cup)
Latino Legends Team (US; Major League Baseball)
Big League World Series – Latin America Region championship (community teams; ages 16–18) (discontinued after 2016)
Senior League World Series – Latin America Region championship (community teams; ages 14–16)
Junior League World Series – Latin America Region championship (community teams; ages 13–15)
Intermediate League World Series – Latin America Region championship (community teams; ages 11–13)
Little League World Series – Caribbean Region championship (community teams; ages 11–13)
Little League World Series – Latin America Region championship (community teams; ages 11–13)
U-10 Pan-American Youth Baseball Championship

Asia 

Asia Series championship (top teams of the professional baseball leagues)
Asian Baseball Championship (national teams)
Baseball at the Asian Games
List of Asian Games medalists in baseball
Baseball at the Southeast Asian Games
Baseball at the East Asian Games
SAARC Baseball Championship (South Asia; national teams)
Baseball at the Far Eastern Championship Games (discontinued)
MALB Asean Series (professional teams)
Asian Junior Baseball Championship (national teams; under 18)
Asian 15U Baseball championship (national teams; under 15)
Asian 12U Baseball championship (national teams; under 12)
Big League World Series – Asia–Pacific Region championship (community teams; ages 16–18) (discontinued in 2016)
Senior League World Series – Asia–Pacific Region championship (community teams; ages 14–16)
Junior League World Series – Asia–Pacific Region championship (community teams; ages 13–15)
Intermediate League World Series – Asia–Pacific Region championship (community teams; ages 11–13)
Little League – Far East Region championship (1962–2000) (community teams; ages 11–13)
Little League – Asia Region championship (2001–2006) (community teams; ages 11–13)
Little League – Asia–Pacific Region championship (2007–2012) (community teams; ages 11–13)
Little League World Series – Asia–Pacific and Middle East Region championship (2013 – ) (community teams; ages 11–13)

Europe 

European Baseball Championship (national teams)
European Champion Cup (one winner; top four teams of the two European Cups)
European Cup (two winners; top teams of the professional baseball leagues)
CEB Cup (second-tier club teams)
Federations Cup (third-tier club teams)
Federations Cup qualifiers (thourth-tier club teams)
Euro League Baseball (ELB) championship (Gregory Hallman Trophy)
European Under-21 Baseball Championship (national teams; under 21)
European Junior Baseball Championship (national teams; under 18)
European Youth Baseball Championship (national teams; under 15)
European Juveniles Baseball Championship (national teams; under 12)
Big League World Series – Europe–Africa Region championship (community teams; ages 16–18) (discontinued in 2016)
Senior League World Series – Europe–Africa Region championship (community teams; ages 14–16)
Junior League World Series – Europe–Africa Region championship (community teams; ages 13–15)
Intermediate League World Series – Europe–Africa Region championship (community teams; ages 11–13)
Little League – Europe Region championship (1960–2000) (community teams; ages 11–13)
Little League – Europe Region championship (2001–2003) (and co-terminus Transatlantic Region) (community teams; ages 11–13)
Little League – Europe / Europe, Middle East & Africa Region championship (2004–2007) (and co-terminus Transatlantic Region) (community teams; ages 11–13)
Little League – Transatlantic Region championship (2001–2007) (community teams; ages 11–13)
Little League – Europe Region championship (2008–2012) (community teams; ages 11–13)
Little League World Series – Europe and Africa Region championship (2013 – ) (community teams; ages 11–13)
 See also footnote

Oceania 
Oceania Baseball Championship (national teams)
Baseball at the Pacific Games
Baseball at the Micronesian Games
Big League World Series – Asia–Pacific Region championship (community teams; ages 16–18) (discontinued in 2016)
Senior League World Series – Asia–Pacific Region championship (community teams; ages 14–16)
Junior League World Series – Asia–Pacific Region championship (community teams; ages 13–15)
Intermediate League World Series – Asia–Pacific Region championship (community teams; ages 11–13)
Little League – Far East Region championship (1962–2000) (community teams; ages 11–13)
Little League – Pacific Region championship (2001–2006) (community teams; ages 11–13)
Little League – Asia–Pacific Region championship (2007–2012) (community teams; ages 11–13)
Little League World Series – Asia–Pacific and Middle East Region championship (2013 – ) (community teams; ages 11–13)

Individual countries

American Samoa 
 Note: Although American Samoa is an unincorporated territory of the United States, it competes separately in international baseball. See: American Samoa national baseball team

Australia

In general 
Greater Brisbane League club championship
New South Wales Major League club championship
Australia Women's Championships (baseball)
Australian Universities Championship Series — see Baseball at the Australian University Games
Australian Schools Championship (baseball)
Australia National Youth Championships (baseball)
Baseball at the Australian Masters Games (quadrennial)
Junior League World Series – Australia Region championship (community teams; ages 13–15)
Little League World Series – Australia Region championship (community teams; ages 11–13)

Claxton Shield 

Claxton Shield champions — National competition
Claxton Shield awards:
Helm's Award (Tournament Most Valuable Player)
Batting Champion
Pitcher of the Year
Golden Glove (Fielding award)
Rookie of the Year
Manager of the Year

Baseball Australia Diamond Awards 

President's Award
ABF Life Membership
Administrator of the Year Award
Club of the Year Award
Official of the Year Award
Volunteer of the Year Award
Coach of the Year Award
Player of the Year (Open Women's Award)
Player of the Year (Youth Award)
State of the Year

Australian Baseball League (2010- ) 

Championship Series champion
Helms Award Winner (league Most Valuable Player)
All-Star Game MVP

Australian Baseball League (1989–1999) (defunct)

Austria 

 See also footnote
 (BLA) championship (German Wikipedia)
Austrian Baseball Federation (Austrian Youth Championships)
Youth Championship

Brazil 

Brazilian Baseball Championship

Brunei

Canada 

Ligue de Baseball Junior Élite du Québec championship (amateur league)
Ligue de Baseball Senior Elite du Quebec championship (amateur league)
New Brunswick Senior Baseball League championship (amateur league)
Nova Scotia Senior Baseball League championship (amateur league)
Harry Hallis Memorial Trophy (Western Major Baseball League champion)
Tip O'Neill Award
Jack Graney Award
Baseball at the Canada Summer Games (quadrennial)
Big League World Series – Canada Region championship (discontinued after 2016)
Senior League World Series – Canada Region championship
Junior League World Series – Canada Region championship
Intermediate League World Series – Canada Region championship
Little League World Series – Canada Region championship

China (People's Republic of China) 

China Baseball League championship

Colombia 

Colombian Professional Baseball League championship (winter league)

Croatia 

See footnote

Cuba 

Cuban National Series championship (amateur leagues)
Cuban National Series Most Valuable Player Award
Cuban National Series Rookie of the Year Award
Cuban League championship (discontinued in 1961; professional winter league)

Dominican Republic 

Dominican Professional Baseball League championship (winter league) (winner takes part in the Caribbean Series)
Dominican Summer League championship

Federated States of Micronesia

France 

Division Élite#Champions

Germany 

Bundesliga championship
Junior German champions
Youth German champions
Students German champions

Greece 

Greek Baseball League championship (2000–2014)

Guam 
 Although Guam is an unincorporated territory of the United States, it competes separately in international baseball. See: Guam national baseball team

Hong Kong 
 Although Hong Kong is a special administrative region of the People's Republic of China, it competes separately in international baseball. See: Hong Kong national baseball team

India

Indonesia

Iran 

Iran Baseball Championship

Ireland 

Irish Baseball League championship
Andy Leonard League MVP Award
Tommy Bond Best Pitcher Award
'Dirty' Jack Doyle Silver Slugger Award
Patsy Donovan Batting Champion Award
 Irish Baseball League A
 Irish Baseball League B
 For other awards, see footnote

Israel

Italy 

Italian Baseball Series championship (professional; major league)
Italian Baseball League 2D championship (professional; minor league)
Serie A Federale championship (amateur)
See also footnote

Japan 

Japan Series championship
Central League championship
Pacific League championship
Nippon Professional Baseball Most Valuable Player Award
Nippon Professional Baseball Rookie of the Year Award
Eiji Sawamura Award (top starting pitcher in all of Nippon Professional Baseball)
Most Valuable Pitcher award (Central League)
Most Valuable Pitcher award (Pacific League)
Best Nine Award – best player at each position in both the Central League and Pacific League
Mitsui Golden Glove Award
Nippon Professional Baseball Comeback Player of the Year Award
Golden Spirit Award
Japan Series Most Valuable Player
Nippon Professional Baseball All-Star Game Most Valuable Player
Matsutaro Shoriki Award
Japan Women's Baseball League championship
Japanese High School Baseball Championship (Summer Koshien)
Japanese High School Baseball Invitational Tournament championship (Spring Koshien)
Little League World Series – All-Japan championship (1967–2006)
Little League World Series – Japan Region championship (2007– )

Malaysia

Mexico 

Mexican League championship
Mexican Pacific League championship (winner takes part in the Caribbean Series) (winter league)
Mexican Academy League championships (Class A summer league and Rookie-level winter league; feeder league for Mexican League)
Mexican Northern League championship (feeder league for Mexican League)
Veracruz Winter League championship (winter league)
Big League World Series – Mexico Region championship (community teams; ages 16–18) (1985–1988; from 2006 to 2016, in odd-numbered years) (discontinued in 2016)
Junior League World Series – Mexico Region championship (community teams; ages 13–15)  (1986–1999; since 2004, in even-numbered years)
Little League World Series – Mexico Region championship (community teams; ages 11–13)

Netherlands 

See also footnote 
Holland Series championship (first tier; winner takes part in the European Cup)
Honkbal Overgangsklasse championship (second tier; winner is promoted to first tier)
Honkbalweek Haarlem Cup championship (youth)

New Caledonia

New Zealand

Nicaragua 

Nicaraguan Professional Baseball League championship (off-season league)

Pakistan

Palau 

Palau Major League championship

Panama 

Panamanian Professional Baseball League championship (winter league)

Philippines 

Baseball Philippines series championship

Poland 

Extra league baseball series championship

Portugal 

Liga Atlântica de Basebol championship

Puerto Rico 
 Although Puerto Rico is a United States commonwealth, it competes separately in international baseball. See: Baseball in Puerto Rico, Puerto Rico national baseball team, and Puerto Rico women's national baseball team.
 See also footnote
Liga de Beisbol Profesional Roberto Clemente (formerly the Puerto Rico Professional Baseball League) championship (winter league) (winner takes part in the Caribbean Series)
Federacion de Beisbol Aficionado de Puerto Rico championship (amateur)
Big League World Series – Puerto Rico Region championship (community teams; ages 16–18) (1981–1997; from 2006 to 2016, in even-numbered years) (discontinued in 2016)
Junior League World Series (Puerto Rico Region) championship (community teams; ages 13–15) (1982–1999; since 2004, in odd-numbered years)
Intermediate League World Series (Puerto Rico Region) championship

Singapore

South Korea 

Korean Series championship
KBO League Most Valuable Player Award
Choi Dong-won Award (pitcher of the year)
KBO League Rookie of the Year
KBO League Golden Gloves
Korean Series Most Valuable Player Award
KBO League All-Star Game Most Valuable Player Award
Phoenix Flag National High School Baseball Championship
Blue Dragon Flag National High School Baseball Championship
Golden Lion Flag National High School Baseball Championship
President's Cup National High School Baseball Championship

Spain 

See also footnote
División de Honor de Béisbol championship

Sweden 

Elitserien championship

Taiwan (Republic of China) 

Taiwan Series championship
CPBL MVP of the Year Award
CPBL Rookie of the Year Award
CPBL Manager of the Year Award
CPBL Golden Glove Award
CPBL most progressive award (comeback player)
Taiwan Series MVP
Taiwan Series Outstanding Player
CPBL All-Star Game MVP
CPBL MVP of the Month

United Kingdom 

Championship Series of the National League

U.S. Virgin Islands 
 Although the U.S. Virgin Islands is an unincorporated territory of the United States, it competes separately in international baseball. See: U.S. Virgin Islands national baseball team

Venezuela 

Venezuelan Professional Baseball League championship [winter league] (winner team takes part in the Caribbean Series)
Liga Paralela de Béisbol en Venezuela championship (winter league; MLB-affiliated)
Luis Aparicio Award. See also: #U.S. major leagues: Awards by organizations other than MLB
Big League World Series (Venezuela Region) (community teams, ages 16–18) (1984–1997)

United States

United States major leagues: Awards by Major League Baseball (MLB) 

 The following awards (except the Edgar Martínez Award, Baseball Assistance Team (B.A.T.) awards, Beacon Awards, and the Fishel Award) appear at MLB.com, on its awards page
 Each award is given to a player (or manager) in each league, except where noted by a superscript ¹

Annual awards 
 Commissioner's Trophy (World Series champion)
World Series rings: Given to members of the World Series champions
 William Harridge Trophy (American League champion)
 Warren C. Giles Trophy (National League champion)
 MLB Most Valuable Player Award: given to the best all-around player
 Cy Young Award: given to the best pitcher
 Jackie Robinson Rookie of the Year Award
 Manager of the Year Award
Platinum Glove Award: given to the best defensive player in each league
 All-MLB Team – First named in 2019; honors the top players in MLB at all positions (first and second teams, each with one player at each non-pitching position, one designated hitter, five starting pitchers, and two relievers)
 Rawlings Gold Glove Awards: given to the best fielder at each position
Wilson Overall Defensive Player of the Year Award1: given to the best defensive player in all of Major League Baseball (in 2012 and 2013, one award in each league)
Wilson Defensive Player of the Year Award1: given to the best fielder at each position in all of Major League Baseball (in 2012 and 2013, was given to one player on each team)
Wilson Defensive Team of the Year1:  given to the best defensive team in all of Major League Baseball
 Silver Slugger Awards: given to the best offensive player at each position
 Players Choice Awards
 Player of the Year (in MLB; for all positions)1
 Outstanding Player (in each league)
 Outstanding Pitcher (in each league)
 Outstanding Rookie (in each league)
 Comeback Player (in each league)
 Marvin Miller Man of the Year Award (in MLB)1
 Majestic Athletic Always Game Award (in MLB)1
 Esurance MLB Awards (formerly "This Year in Baseball Awards" (2002–2009) and then the "GIBBY Awards" (Greatness in Baseball Yearly) (2010–2014))¹: voting by fans, media, front-office personnel, former players, and SABR
Note: Current awards are in boldface.
 Best Major Leaguer – formerly MLB MVP¹ (2012–2013; renamed "Most Valuable Major Leaguer" in 2014 and then "Best Major Leaguer" in 2015)
 Best Hitter – formerly Hitter of the Year Award¹ (2004–2009 and 2012–2013), "Player of the Year" (2002–2003 and 2010–2011), and "Best Everyday Player" (2014–2015)
 Best Pitcher (for all pitchers) – formerly Starting Pitcher of the Year Award¹ (2004–2013) and Best Starting Pitcher (2014–2015); formerly "Pitcher of the Year"—from 2002 to 2003—including starters and closers, but not setup men); in 2015, there was no awards category for Closer or Setup Man
 Best Rookie – formerly Rookie of the Year Award¹
 Best Starting Pitcher (discontinued in 2016) – see: "Best Pitcher," above
 Best Closer (discontinued in 2015) – formerly Closer of the Year Award¹ (2004–2013); formerly "Pitcher of the Year"—from 2002 to 2003—including starters and closers, but not setup men)
 Best Setup Man (discontinued in 2015) – formerly Setup Man of the Year Award¹ (2002–2013)
 Best Defensive Player – formerly Defensive Player of the Year Award¹
 Best Breakout Everyday Player (discontinued in 2016) – formerly Breakout Hitter of the Year Award¹ (formerly "Breakout Player of the Year")
 Best Breakout Pitcher (discontinued in 2016) – formerly Breakout Pitcher of the Year Award¹ (formerly "Breakout Player of the Year")
 Best Bounceback Player (discontinued in 2016) – formerly Comeback Player of the Year Award¹
 Wow Factor of the Year Award¹ (discontinued in 2012) (formerly "Unsung Star of the Year" and "X-Factor Player of the Year")
 Dependable Player of the Year Award¹ (2010; discontinued in 2011)
 Best Social Media Personality
 Best Executive – formerly Executive of the Year Award¹
 Best Manager – formerly Manager of the Year Award¹
 Best Major Leaguer, Postseason – formerly Postseason MVP Award¹
 Lifetime Achievement Award¹ (2013; discontinued in 2014)
 Best Play, Defense – formerly Play of the Year Award¹
 Best Play, Offense – formerly Play of the Year Award
 Best Outfield Throw (2014; discontinued in 2015)
 Best Moment – formerly Moment of the Year Award¹
 Best Storyline – formerly Storyline of the Year Award¹ (discontinued in 2015)
 Best Performance – formerly Hitting Performance of the Year Award¹ and Pitching Performance of the Year (both were formerly "Single-Game Performance of the Year" and then "Performance of the Year")
 Best Social Media Post
 Best Celebrity Fan (2015; discontinued in 2016)
 Best Fan Catch
 Best MLB Interview (2015; discontinued in 2016)
 Best Call, TV/Radio
 Best Player–Fan Interaction
 Best Video Board Moment (2015; discontinued in 2016)
 Best Trending Topic
 Best Oddity (discontinued in 2015) – formerly Oddity of the Year Award¹ (formerly "Blooper of the Year" and "Bizarre Play of the Year")
 Best Walk-Off (discontinued in 2015) – formerly Walk-Off of the Year Award¹ (formerly "Game of the Year")
 Best Cut4 Topic (divided into Best Fan Catch and Best Player-Fan Interaction in 2015; both were discontinued in 2016) – formerly Cut4 Topic of the Year Award¹ (formerly "Fan Moment of the Year")
 Postseason Moment of the Year Award¹ (replaced by Best Postseason Play, Best Postseason Walk-Off, and Best Postseason Storyline in 2014) (all three were discontinued in 2015)
 Hank Aaron Award: given to the best offensive performer
 Rod Carew American League Batting Champion
 Tony Gwynn National League Batting Champion
 Major League Baseball Reliever of the Year Award – Two awards for relief pitchers, one for each MLB league:
 Mariano Rivera American League Reliever of the Year Award
 Trevor Hoffman National League Reliever of the Year Award
 MLB Delivery Man of the Year Award¹: given to the best relief pitcher (discontinued and replaced in 2014, by the Mariano Rivera AL and Trevor Hoffman NL Reliever of the Year awards)
 Rolaids Relief Man Award: given to the best relief pitcher (discontinued in 2013)
 Edgar Martínez Outstanding Designated Hitter Award (American League)
 MLB Comeback Player of the Year Award
 MLB Clutch Performer of the Year Award (discontinued)
 Roberto Clemente Award¹: given to a player who "best exemplifies the game of baseball, sportsmanship, community involvement and the individual's contribution to his team"
 World Series MVP Award¹
 National League Championship Series MVP Award
 Lee MacPhail MVP Award (American League Championship Series)
 MLB All-Star Game team members
 Ted Williams MVP Award¹ (All-Star Game) (from 1970 to 1984, the award was known as the "Commissioner's Trophy", which became the name for the World Series Trophy in 1985)
 All-Star Game—Home Run Derby champion¹
 Baseball Assistance Team (B.A.T.) awards:
 Big B.A.T./Frank Slocum Award: given to "an individual or a group of individuals whose exemplary service to the B.A.T. organization has helped provide dignity and self-esteem to members of the Baseball Family.
 Bart Giamatti Award: given to the "individual associated with baseball who best exemplifies the compassion demonstrated by the late commissioner." Generally, it is given to a player involved in a wide range of charity work, benefitting both those involved with the game of baseball and those in the community at large.
 Bobby Murcer Award: given to the team from each league that donates the most money during the annual B.A.T. Spring Training Fundraising Tour.
 Beacon Awards: Beacon of Life Award, Beacon of Change Award, and Beacon of Hope Award
 Commissioner's Award for Philanthropic Excellence
 Fishel Award: for public-relations excellence
 Bob Feller Act of Valor Award

Monthly and weekly awards 
 Note: The following monthly and weekly awards appear at MLB.com, on its awards page for the current season
Player of the Month (NL since 1958; AL since 1974)
Pitcher of the Month (NL since 1975; AL since 1979)
Reliever of the Month (NL & AL since 2017)
Rookie of the Month (NL & AL since 2001)
Delivery Man of the Month¹ (discontinued after the 2013 season)
Clutch Performer of the Month¹ (discontinued)
Players of the Week (all positions)

One-time awards 
 Note: The following awards are one-time-only awards.
Triple Crown (batting)
Triple Crown (pitching)
Commissioner's Historic Achievement Award
MLB All-Century Team (1999)
Latino Legends Team (2005)
DHL Hometown Heroes (2006): the most outstanding player in the history of each MLB franchise, based on on-field performance, leadership quality and character value.
Rawlings All-time Gold Glove Team (2007)

¹ A combined award is given for the American and National Leagues.

U.S. major leagues: Awards by organizations other than MLB 
 Note: The following awards do not appear at MLB.com, on its awards page
(Each award is given to a player (or manager) in each league, except where noted by a superscript ¹.)

All-time 
MLB All-Time Team (1997; Baseball Writers' Association of America)
MLB All-Time Manager (1997; BBWAA)
Baseball's 100 Greatest Players (1998; The Sporting News)

All-decade 
1990s
Baseball Prospectus "Internet Baseball Awards" Team of the Decade¹ (1999)
Players Choice Awards Player of the Decade¹ (1999)
The Sporting News Player of the Decade¹ (1999)

2000s
Sporting News All-Decade Team¹ (2009)
Sports Illustrated MLB All-Decade Team¹ (2009)
Sporting News MLB Athlete of the Decade¹ (2009)
Sports Illustrated Player of the Decade¹ (2009)
Sporting News Manager of the Decade¹ (2009)
Sports Illustrated Best Manager¹ (2009)
Sporting News Team of the Decade¹ (2009)
Sports Illustrated MLB Top Single-Season Team of the Decade¹ (2009)
Sporting News Executive of the Decade¹ (2009)
Sports Illustrated Best General Manager¹ (2009)
Sports Illustrated Best Franchise¹ (2009)
Sporting News Performance of the Decade¹ (2009)
Sporting News Game of the Decade¹ (2009)
Sports Illustrated Best Regular-Season Game¹ (2009)
Sports Illustrated Best Post-Season Game¹ (2009)

Other individual awards 
 Baseball America Major League Player of the Year¹ (for all positions)
Best Major League Baseball Player ESPY Award¹ (for all positions)
Sporting News Player of the Year¹ (for all positions) (there are also Starting Pitcher and Relief Pitcher awards for each league)
Baseball Digest Player of the Year¹ (for position players) (from 1969 to 1993, included all positions; in 1994, a separate Pitcher of the Year award was added)
BBWAA New York Chapter Sid Mercer-Dick Young Player of the Year Award¹ (discontinued; replaced by the New York Player of the Year Award)
"Greg Spira Memorial Internet Baseball Awards" Most Valuable Player
NLBM Oscar Charleston Legacy Award ("Most Valuable Players")
The Sporting News Most Valuable Player Award (discontinued in 1946)
Baseball Digest Pitcher of the Year¹
"Greg Spira Memorial Internet Baseball Awards" Pitcher of the Year
NLBM Leroy "Satchel" Paige Legacy Award ("Pitchers of the Year"; 2000–2005)
NLBM Wilbur "Bullet" Rogan Legacy Award ("Pitchers of the Year"; 2006–present)
Sporting News Pitcher of the Year (replaced in 2013 by Starting Pitcher and Relief Pitcher of the Year awards)
Sporting News Starting Pitcher of the Year (2013–present)
NLBM Hilton Smith Legacy Award ("Relievers of the Year")
Sporting News Reliever of the Year (formerly The Sporting News Fireman of the Year Award, for closers, from 1960 to 2000) (discontinued in 2011)
Sporting News Relief Pitcher of the Year (2013–present)
Warren Spahn Award¹ (best left-handed pitcher)
Baseball America Rookie of the Year¹
"Greg Spira Memorial Internet Baseball Awards" Rookie of the Year
NLBM Larry Doby Legacy Award ("Rookies of the Year")
Sporting News Rookie of the Year (For its first three years—1946 to 1948—and in 1950, the award was given to only one player in all of MLB. In 1949 and from 1951 to the present, the award has been given in each of the two leagues. In 1961 and from 1963 through 2003, TSN split the rookie award into two separate categories: Rookie Pitcher of the Year and Rookie Player of the Year.)
Baseball America All-Rookie Team
Topps All-Star Rookie Team
Sophomore of the Year Award (discontinued in 1963)
NLBM Walter "Buck" Leonard Legacy Award (batting champions)
Babe Ruth Home Run Award¹ (MLB home run leader) (discontinued in 2010)
Mel Ott Award (NL home run leader)
NLBM Josh Gibson Legacy Award (AL & NL "Home Run" leaders)
NLBM James "Cool Papa" Bell Legacy Award ("Stolen Base" leaders)
Fielding Bible Award (defense)
Sporting News Comeback Player of the Year
Sporting News All-Star Team (From 1925 to 1960, the team was a combined team for both leagues. Starting in 1961, a team was named for each league.)
Babe Ruth Award¹ (postseason MVP) (since 2007; was awarded to the MVP of the World Series from 1949 to 2006)
MLB Insiders Club Magazine All-Postseason Team
Heart & Hustle Award¹: given by the Major League Baseball Players Alumni Association to a player who excels on the field and "best embodies the values, spirit and tradition of the game."
Hutch Award¹: given to a player who best exemplifies the fighting spirit and competitive desire to win.
Lou Gehrig Memorial Award¹: given to a player who best exemplifies his character and integrity both on and off the field.
Tony Conigliaro Award¹: given to a player who best overcomes an obstacle and adversity through the attributes of spirit, determination and courage.
BBWAA New York Chapter Arthur and Milton Richman "You Gotta Have Heart" Award¹
Branch Rickey Award¹: given to a player in recognition of exceptional community service.
BBWAA New York Chapter Joan Payson/Shannon Forde Award¹: for excellence in community service
Luis Aparicio Award (Venezuelan player) (See also: , above.)
Baseball America Manager of the Year1
Chuck Tanner Major League Baseball Manager of the Year Award¹
"Greg Spira Memorial Internet Baseball Awards" Manager of the Year
NLBM Charles Isham "C. I." Taylor Legacy Award ("Managers of the Year")
Sporting News Manager of the Year
Associated Press Manager of the Year (discontinued in 2001)
Honor Rolls of Baseball (managers)
Baseball America Major League Coach of the Year¹
Baseball America Major League Executive of the Year¹
NLBM Andrew "Rube" Foster Legacy Award ("Executives of the Year")
Sporting News Executive of the Year¹
Honor Rolls of Baseball (executives)
Baseball America Roland Hemond Award: for long-term contributions to scouting and player development
Baseball America Lifetime Achievement Award
Buck O'Neil Lifetime Achievement Award (National Baseball HoF; presented no more frequently than every third year)
NLBM Jackie Robinson Lifetime Achievement Award: for "Career Excellence in the Face of Adversity"
NLBM John Henry "Pop" Lloyd Legacy Award: in recognition of "Baseball and Community Leadership"
Baseball America Organization of the Year1
Ford C. Frick Award (National Baseball HoF; for broadcasters)
BBWAA Career Excellence Award (Baseball Writers' Association of America; for writers)
NLBM Sam Lacy Legacy Award ("Baseball Writer of the Year")
Honor Rolls of Baseball (baseball writers)
Hall of Fame (umpires)
Retired numbers (umpires)
Honor Rolls of Baseball (umpires)
NLBM John "Buck" O'Neil Legacy Award: given to a local or national corporate/private philanthropist for "Outstanding Support of the NLBM"
1 A combined award is given for the American and National leagues.

Awards given to specific teams 
 Ohio Cup (trophy awarded to winner of Reds–Indians best-of-4 regular-season series)
 BP Crosstown Cup (trophy awarded to winner of White Sox–Cubs best-of-4 regular-season series)

Awards given to members of specific teams 

 Cincinnati Reds: Ernie Lombardi Award (MVP)
 Cincinnati Reds: Pitcher of the Year
 Cleveland Indians: Bob Feller Man of the Year Award (player or other team personnel)
 Cleveland Indians: Frank Gibbons-Steve Olin Good Guy Award
 Detroit Tigers: Tiger of the Year
 Detroit Tigers: Tiger Rookie of the Year Award
 Detroit Tigers: King Tiger Award (for on-field and off-field contributions)
 Houston Astros: Darryl Kile Good Guy Award
 Los Angeles Angels of Anaheim: Gene Autry Trophy (MVP)
 Los Angeles Dodgers: Roy Campanella Award (spirit and leadership)
 Montreal Expos: Player of the Year (discontinued in 2004)
 New York Mets and New York Yankees: BBWAA New York Chapter "New York Player of the Year Award" (replaced the Sid Mercer-Dick Young Player of the Year Award)
 New York Yankees: James P. Dawson Award (best rookie)
 Oakland Athletics: Catfish Hunter Award (most inspirational player)
 Philadelphia Phillies: Mike Schmidt Most Valuable Player Award, Steve Carlton Most Valuable Pitcher Award, Dallas Green Special Achievement Award, Tug McGraw Good Guy Award, and Charlie Manuel Award for Service and Passion to Baseball
 Philadelphia Phillies: Richie Ashburn Special Achievement Award (player or other team personnel)
 San Francisco Giants: Willie Mac Award (spirit and leadership)
 St. Louis Cardinals: Darryl Kile Good Guy Award
 Toronto Blue Jays: Neil MacCarl Award (player of the year)

U.S. minor leagues

In general

Awards by Minor League Baseball (MiLB) 

 Minor League Baseball Yearly (MiLBY) Awards (formerly "This Year in Minor League Baseball Awards"):
 Best Starter (in each of five levels: Triple-A, Double-A, Class A Advanced, Class A – Full Season, and Class A – Short Season)
 Best Hitter (in each of five levels: Triple-A, Double-A, Class A Advanced, Class A – Full Season, and Class A – Short Season)
 Best Reliever (in each of five levels: Triple-A, Double-A, Class A Advanced, Class A – Full Season, and Class A – Short Season)
 Best Game (in each of five levels: Triple-A, Double-A, Class A Advanced, Class A – Full Season, and Class A – Short Season)
 Best Team (in each of five levels: Triple-A, Double-A, Class A Advanced, Class A – Full Season, and Class A – Short Season)
 Homer of the Year (one overall winner, for all of minor-league baseball)
 Play of the Year (one overall winner, for all of minor-league baseball)
 Moment of the Year (one overall winner, for all of minor-league baseball)
 Best Promotion of the Year (one overall winner, for all of minor-league baseball)
 Best Theme Night of the Year (one overall winner, for all of minor-league baseball)
 Best Giveaway of the Year (one overall winner, for all of minor-league baseball)
 Best Celebrity Appearance of the Year (one overall winner, for all of minor-league baseball)
 Best Miscellaneous Promotion of the Year (one overall winner, for all of minor-league baseball)
 MiLB Topps Minor League Player of the Year Award (Topps Player of the Year, across all of MiLB)
 MiLB George M. Trautman Awards (Topps Player of the Year, in each of the domestic minor leagues)
 MiLB Joe Bauman Home Run Award
 John H. Johnson President's Award (franchise)
 Rawlings Woman Executive of the Year
 Warren Giles Award (league president)
 King of Baseball
 Larry MacPhail Award (team promotions)
 Sheldon "Chief" Bender Award (player development)
 Mike Coolbaugh Award (work ethic, knowledge of the game, and mentoring young players)
 100 Best Minor League Baseball Teams (1901–2001)

Awards by organizations other than MiLB 
Baseball America Minor League Player of the Year Award
The Sporting News Minor League Player of the Year Award
USA Today Minor League Player of the Year Award
Baseball America Minor League All-Star Team (First team and Second team)
Baseball America Triple-A Classification All-Star Team
Baseball America Double-A Classification All-Star Team
Baseball America High Class A Classification All-Star Team
Baseball America Low Class A Classification All-Star Team
Baseball America Rookie-Level Classification All-Star Team
Baseball America Dominican Summer League Classification All-Star Team
Baseball America Short-Season Classification All-Star Team
Topps Short Season-A/Rookie All-Star Team
Baseball America Independent Leagues Player of the Year
Larry Doby Award (MLB "Futures Game" MVP)
Baseball America Minor League Manager of the Year
Baseball America Minor League Team of the Year
Baseball America Minor League Executive of the Year
Sporting News Minor League Organization of the Year
 Minor League News Farm System of the Year
 Baseball America Bob Freitas Awards (for outstanding minor-league operations at Triple-A, Double-A, Class A, and short-season)
 Baseball America Independent Organization of the Year
 Ballpark Digest Awards (minor leagues, independent leagues, and collegiate summer leagues)
 STMA Sports Turf Manager of the Year Awards (in Triple-A, Double-A, Class A, and Short-Season/Rookie; chosen from the 16 league winners)

Awards by MLB team organizations 
Houston Astros: Minor League Player of the Year and Minor League Pitcher of the Year
Los Angeles Dodgers: Minor League Player of the Year and Pitcher of the Year
New York Yankees: Kevin Lawn Awards for player of the year and pitcher of the year
Philadelphia Phillies: Paul Owens Award for player of the year and pitcher of the year.
Toronto Blue Jays: Minor League Player of the Year

Triple-A 
Triple-A National Championship Game (2006– )
Triple-A National Championship Game Most Valuable Player Award
Triple-A All-Star Game (The awards vary from year to year: Stars of the Game, Top Stars, MVP (discontinued), Stars of Stars (discontinued), Batter-of-the-Game (discontinued), Pitcher-of-the-Game (discontinued).)
Little World Series championship (1904–1931)
Junior World Series championship (1932–1975)
Triple-A Classic championship (1988–1991)
Triple-A World Series championship (1983, 1998–2000)

International League 

International League Governors' Cup (Championship Series champion)
International League Most Valuable Player Award
International League Pitcher of the Year Award (formerly the Most Valuable Pitcher Award)
International League Top MLB Prospect Award (formerly the Rookie of the Year Award)
International League Manager of the Year Award
Thruway Cup (trophy awarded to the team with the best record among the Buffalo Bisons, Rochester Red Wings, and Syracuse Mets in games played against each other during the International League regular season)

Pacific Coast League 

Pacific Coast League championship
Pacific Coast League Most Valuable Player Award
Pacific Coast League Pitcher of the Year Award
Pacific Coast League Top MLB Prospect Award (formerly the Rookie of the Year Award)
Pacific Coast League post-season All-Star teams
Pacific Coast League Manager of the Year Award
Pacific Coast League Executive of the Year Award

Double-A 
Double-A All-Star Game (1991–2002)

Eastern League 
Eastern League championship
Eastern League Most Valuable Player Award
Eastern League Pitcher of the Year Award
Eastern League Rookie of the Year Award
Eastern League Manager of the Year Award

Southern League 

Southern League All-Star Game
Southern League championship
Southern League Manager of the Year Award
Southern League Most Outstanding Pitcher Award
Southern League Most Valuable Player Award

Texas League 

Texas League championship
Texas League Most Valuable Player Award
Texas League Pitcher of the Year Award
Texas League Manager of the Year Award
Texas League Mike Coolbaugh Memorial Coach of the Year Award

Single-A Advanced

California League 

California League championship
California League Most Valuable Player Award
California League Pitcher of the Year Award
California League Rookie of the Year Award
Carolina/California All-Star Game Most Valuable Player Award
California League Manager of the Year Award
California League Executive of the Year Award
California League Organization of the Year Award
Doug Harvey Award (umpire of the year)

Carolina League 
Carolina League championship
Carolina League Most Valuable Player Award
Carolina League Pitcher of the Year
Carolina League Championship Series Most Valuable Player
Carolina/California All-Star Game Most Valuable Player
Carolina League Manager of the Year
Carolina League Calvin Falwell Executive of the Year
Carolina League Matt Minker Community Service Award

Florida State League 

 Florida State League championship
 Florida State League Player of the Year Award
 Florida State League Pitcher of the Year Award
 Florida State League Manager of the Year Award

Single-A

Midwest League 
 List of Midwest League champions
 Midwest League Manager of the Year Award
 Midwest League Most Valuable Player Award
 Midwest League Top MLB Prospect Award

South Atlantic League 

South Atlantic League championship

Single-A Short Season

New York-Penn League 

New York–Penn League championship

Northwest League 
Northwest League#Champions

Rookie Advanced

Appalachian League 

List of Appalachian League champions

Pioneer League 
Pioneer League (baseball)#League champions

Rookie leagues

Arizona League 
Arizona League#Champions

Dominican Summer League 

Dominican Summer League#Champions

Gulf Coast League 
Gulf Coast League championship

Fall leagues (affiliated)

Arizona Fall League 

Arizona Fall League championship
Arizona Fall League Joe Black MVP Award
Arizona Fall League Dernell Stenson Sportsmanship Award

U.S. independent professional leagues

Traditional season 
 League championships
 American Association of Professional Baseball championship
 Atlantic League of Professional Baseball championship
 Empire Professional Baseball League championship
 Frontier League championship
 Pecos League championship
 United Shore Professional Baseball League championship

Individual awards
 Baseball America Independent Leagues Player of the Year

Winter 
 Arizona Winter League championship
 California Winter League championship
 Desert League of Professional Baseball championship

U.S. adult and semi-professional baseball

National Adult Baseball Association (NABA) 

NABA Phoenix World Championship Series
Division championships: 18 Wood, 18AA, 18A, 18 Rookie, 25 Wood, 25 Aluminum, 35 Wood, 35 Aluminum, 45 Wood, 45 Aluminum, 50 Wood, 55 Wood, 60 Wood.
Awards:
Team Champions: team trophy and NABA World Series championship rings
Team Runner-up: team trophy and NABA World Series championship watches
Team Pool Champion: team pool trophy
Championship Game Gold Glove: individual Gold Glove award for each championship game
Championship Game MVP: individual MVP award for each championship game
Pool Game MVP: individual Game MVP award in each pool game for both teams
NABA Women's World Championship Series
Awards:
Champions: team trophy and NABA World Series commemorative championship medal
Runner-up: team trophy and NABA World Series commemorative finalist medal
Pool Winner: team pool trophy
Championship Game Gold Glove: individual Gold Glove award for each championship game
Championship Game MVP: individual MVP award for each championship game
Pool Game MVP: individual Game MVP award in each pool game for both teams
NABA Florida World Championship Series
Division championships: 18AA, 18A, 18 Rookie, 18 Open Wood Bat, 25 Rookie, 35 Rookie, 45 Rookie, 55 Rookie
Awards:
Champions: team trophy and NABA World Series championship rings
Runner-up: team trophy and NABA World Series championship watches
Pool Winner: team pool trophy
Championship Game Gold Glove: individual Gold Glove award for each championship game
Championship Game MVP: individual MVP award for each championship game
Pool Game MVP: individual Game MVP award in each pool game for both teams
NABA tournaments

U.S. amateur baseball

All-American Amateur Baseball Association (AAABA) 

AAABA World Series

National Amateur Baseball Federation 

NABF Major World Series championship

Special Olympics 
Baseball at the Special Olympics USA National Games

State Games of America 
Baseball at the State Games of America

U.S. collegiate summer baseball

National Alliance of College Summer Baseball (NACSB) 

Most Valuable Program Award

National Amateur Baseball Federation (NABF) 

NABF College World Series championship

National Baseball Congress (NBC) 

NBC World Series championship
Graduate of the Year

U.S. college baseball

Team awards 
 College World Series championship (NCAA Division I)
 NCAA Division II Baseball Championship
 NCAA Division III Baseball Championship
 NAIA Baseball World Series championship
 NCBA World Series division D1 championship (National Club Baseball Association)
 NCBA World Series division D2 championship
 JUCO World Series (NJCAA) championship
 American Baseball Coaches Association (ABCA) National Champions in: NCAA Divisions I, II, and III, NAIA, and NJCAA Divisions I, II, and III
 American Baseball Coaches Association (ABCA) Conference Champions in: NCAA Division I, II, and III conferences, NAIA conferences, NJCAA Division I, II, and III conferences, NCCAA conferences, and community-college conferences
 Big 12 Conference championship
 Big 12 Conference Tournament championship
 Big East Conference championship
 Big East Conference Tournament championship
 Big Ten Conference championship (1896–1980 and 1993–present)
 Big Ten Conference Tournament championship (1981–present)

Individual awards 
 Dick Howser Trophy (player of the year) (National Collegiate Baseball Writers Association)
 Baseball America College Player of the Year Award
 Golden Spikes Award (outstanding amateur player) (USA Baseball)
 American Baseball Coaches Association (ABCA) Player of the Year in: NCAA Divisions I, II, and III, NAIA, and NJCAA Divisions I, II, and III
 Collegiate Baseball Player of the Year (NCAA Division I)
 Rotary Smith Award (1988–2003; most outstanding player) (discontinued)
 Roger Clemens Award (pitcher) 
 National Pitcher of the Year Award (College Baseball Foundation)
 Johnny Bench Award (catcher)
 Brooks Wallace Award (shortstop)
John Olerud Award (two-way player)
 D3baseball.com Player of the Year (Division III)
 D3baseball.com Pitcher of the Year (Division III)
 Lowe's Senior CLASS Award (baseball) (outstanding senior NCAA Division I Student-Athlete of the Year in baseball)
 All-America teams:
 ABCA/Rawlings All-Americans (first, second, and third teams) in: NCAA Divisions I, II, and III, NAIA, and NJCAA Divisions I, II, and III
 Baseball America All-America teams
 Collegiate Baseball All-Americans (NCAA Division I)
 D3baseball.com All-Americans (Division III)
 NCBWA All-Americans
 College Baseball All-America Team consensus selections
 ABCA/Rawlings Gold Glove in: NCAA Divisions I, II, and III, NAIA, NJCAA Divisions I, II, and III, and Pacific Association Division
 ABCA/Rawlings All-Region teams in: NCAA Divisions I, II, and III, NAIA, and NJCAA Divisions I, II, and III
 College World Series Most Outstanding Player
 JUCO World Series MVP (NJCAA)
 JUCO World Series All-Tournament team (NJCAA)
 Baseball America Freshman of the Year
 Collegiate Baseball Freshman Pitcher of the Year
 Collegiate Baseball Freshman Player of the Year
 Baseball America Freshman All-America Team
 Louisville Slugger's Freshmen All-American Baseball Team (Collegiate Baseball)
 Baseball America Summer College Player of the Year
 American Baseball Coaches Association (ABCA) National and Regional Coaches of the Year in: NCAA Divisions I, II, and III, NAIA, NJCAA Divisions I, II, and III, and Pacific Association Division
 Baseball America College Coach of the Year
 Collegiate Baseball Coach of the Year (NCAA Division I)
 National Collegiate Baseball Writers Association (NCBWA) National Coach of the Year
 Skip Bertman Award (National Coach of the Year)
 Chuck Tanner Collegiate Baseball Manager of the Year Award
 ABCA/Baseball America Assistant Coach of the Year
Conference coaches of the year (NCAA Division I conferences)
National Collegiate Umpire Award (College Baseball Foundation)
George H.W. Bush Distinguished Alumnus Award (College Baseball Foundation)
 Baseball Field of the Year Award
 ABCA/Turface Athletics Field Maintenance Awards

Conference-specific awards
 America East Conference baseball awards
 American Athletic Conference baseball awards
 ASUN Conference baseball awards
 Atlantic 10 Conference baseball awards
 Atlantic Coast Conference baseball awards
 Big 12 Conference baseball awards
 Big Ten Conference baseball awards
 Mid-American Conference Baseball Player and Pitcher of the Year
 Pac-12 Conference baseball awards
 Southeastern Conference baseball awards
 Southern Conference baseball awards

U.S. high-school baseball 

American Baseball Coaches Association (ABCA)/Rawlings High School Player of the Year
Baseball America High School Player of the Year Award
Gatorade High School Baseball Player of the Year
USA Today High School Baseball Player of the Year
Aflac National High School Player of the Year
Baseball America High School Team of the Year
USA Today All-USA High School Baseball Team
Jackie Robinson Award: to the high school player entering senior year and best displays character, leadership, and the values of being a student-athlete in academics and community affairs
ABCA/Rawlings High School All-America Baseball Team (first, second, and third teams)
Baseball America High School All-America Teams
ABCA/Rawlings High School Gold Glove
Under Armour All-America Baseball Game (all-star game)
Perfect Game All-American Classic (East-West all-star game)
ABCA/Rawlings High School All-Region teams
Baseball America Youth Player of the Year
USA Today High School Baseball Coach of the Year
ABCA/Diamond High School National and Regional Coaches of the Year
Baseball America Youth Coach of the Year
The National Classic (tournament for top high-school teams) (Fullerton, California)
Perfect Game All-American Classic (all-star game for rising seniors) (San Diego, California)
Slammers Baseball / NABA 18 & Under and 16 & Under High School Showcase Tournament (wood bat)
Division championships:
18 & Under (seniors and juniors) – Goodyear, Arizona
16 & Under (sophomores and freshmen) – Glendale, Arizona
Awards:
Champions: team trophy and individual awards
Runner-up: team trophy
Championship Game Gold Glove: individual Gold Glove award for each championship game
Championship Game MVP: individual MVP award for each championship game
Maine Baseball Coaches Association awards
Massachusetts: MIAA Division 1A baseball tournament

U.S. youth baseball

National Youth Baseball Championship 

12U National Youth Baseball Championship
10U National Youth Baseball Championship

USA Baseball Tournament of Stars

American Amateur Baseball Congress (AABC) 

Stan Musial World Series national championship (ages 19 and over)
Connie Mack World Series national championship (ages 18 and under)
Don Mattingly World Series national championship (age 17)
Mickey Mantle World Series national championship (ages 16 and under)
Ken Griffey, Jr. World Series national championship (age 15)
Sandy Koufax 14U World Series national championship (ages 14 and under)
Sandy Koufax 13S World Series national championship (age 13)
Pee Wee Reese World Series national championship (ages 12 and under)
Gil Hodges World Series national championship (age 11)
Willie Mays World Series national championship (ages 10 and under)
Jackie Robinson World Series national championship (age 9)
Roberto Clemente World Series national championship (ages 7–8)
Rod Carew World Series national championship (ages 6 and under)

American Legion Baseball 

American Legion Baseball national championship (ages 19 and under)
American Legion Baseball state champions (including Puerto Rico)
Louisville Slugger Batting Champion (highest batting average during national competition)
Bob Feller Pitching Award (pitcher with most strikeouts in regional and national competition)
Dr. Irvin L. "Click" Cowger RBI Memorial Award (most RBI at the regional tournament and World Series)
Rawlings Big Stick Award (player who rounds the most bases in regional and national competition)
George W. Rulon Player of the Year (based on integrity, mental attitude, cooperation, citizenship, sportsmanship, scholastic aptitude and general good conduct)
James F. Daniel, Jr. Memorial Sportsmanship Award (Legion World Series participant who best embodies the principles of good sportsmanship)
All-Academic Team
Jack Williams Memorial Leadership Award (manager and coach of the national championship team)
American Legion Graduate of the Year (an alumnus, who is a Major League Baseball player; for character, leadership, playing abilities and community service)

Babe Ruth League 

 See also footnote
 16-18-year-old baseball World Series national championship
 13-15-year-old baseball World Series national championship
 14-year-old baseball World Series national championship
 13-year-old baseball World Series national championship
 Cal Ripken Major/70 baseball World Series national championship (ages 11–12) (The U.S. champion plays the International champion for the World Series title.)
 Cal Ripken Major/60 baseball World Series national championship (ages 11–12) (From 2000 to 2006, the U.S. champion played an International champion for the World Series title.)
 Cal Ripken 10-year-old baseball World Series national championship

Cal Ripken Baseball

Dixie Boys Baseball 
Dixie Majors World Series national championship (ages 15–19)
Dixie Pre Majors World Series national championship (ages 15–16)
Dixie Boys World Series national championship (ages 13–14)
Junior Dixie Boys World Series national championship (age 13)

Dixie Youth Baseball 
 See footnote
Majors World Series national championship (ages 12 and under)
AAA World Series national championship (ages 10 and under)
"O" Zone World Series national championship

Little League Baseball 

Big League World Series national champions (ages 16–18) (discontinued after 2016)
 :Category:Big League World Series Regions: Central, East, Southeast, Southwest, and West regions (discontinued after 2016)
Big League World Series state champions (including District of Columbia, Northern California, Southern California, Texas East, Texas West, and Dakotas champions) (discontinued after 2016)
:Category:Senior League World Series Regions (ages 14–16): Central, East, Southeast, Southwest, and West regions
Senior League World Series state champions (including District of Columbia, Northern California, Southern California, Texas East, Texas West, and Dakotas champions)
Junior League World Series national champions (ages 13–15)
:Category:Junior League World Series Regions: Central, East, Southeast, Southwest, and West regions
Junior League World Series state champions (including District of Columbia, Northern California, Southern California, Texas East, Texas West, and Dakotas champions)
Intermediate League World Series national champions (ages 11–13)
:Category:Intermediate League World Series Regions: Central, East, Southeast, Southwest, and West regions
Intermediate League World Series state champions (including District of Columbia, Northern California, Southern California, Texas East, Texas West, and Dakotas champions)
Little League World Series national champions (1976–present) (ages 11–13)
Little League World Series regional champions (U.S.):
 For international regional champions, see 
New England Region (Maine New Hampshire, Vermont, Massachusetts, Rhode Island, Connecticut)
Mid-Atlantic Region (Pennsylvania, New York, New Jersey, Maryland, DC, Delaware)
Midwest Region (North Dakota/South Dakota, Nebraska, Kansas, Minnesota, Iowa, Missouri)
Great Lakes Region (Michigan, Wisconsin, Ohio, Indiana, Illinois. Kentucky)
Southeast Region (Virginia, West Virginia, North Carolina, South Carolina, Georgia, Florida, Alabama, Tennessee)
Southwest Region (Mississippi, Louisiana, Arkansas, Texas East, Texas West, Oklahoma, Colorado, New Mexico)
Northwest Region (Arkansas, Washington, Oregon, Idaho, Montana, Wyoming)
West Region (Arizona, Nevada, Utah, California Northern, California Southern, Hawaii)
Little League World Series state champions (including District of Columbia, Northern California, Southern California, Texas East, Texas West, and Dakotas champions) (ages 11–13)
Little League World Series district champions (ages 11–13)
Little League Baseball awards:
See also: Peter J. McGovern Little League Museum#Hall of Excellence
Good Sport of the Year Award
Challenger Award
ASAP (A Safety Awareness Program) Award
Bill Shea Distinguished Little League Graduate Award
Mom of the Year Award
George and Barbara Bush Little League Parents of the Year Award
Volunteer of the Year Award
Howard and Gail Paster Little League Urban Initiative Volunteer of the Year Award
Howard Hartman Little League Friendship Award

National Amateur Baseball Federation (NABF) 

NABF Senior World Series (ages 18 and under)
NABF High School World Series (ages 17 and under)
NABF Junior World Series (ages 16 and under)
NABF Sophomore World Series (ages 14 and under)
NABF Freshman World Series (ages 12 and under)
NABF Rookie World Series (ages 10 and under)

PONY Baseball 

Palomino League World Series (ages 17–19) (including community teams from other nations)
Colt League World Series (ages 15–16) (including community teams from other nations)
Pony League World Series (ages 13–14) (including community teams from other nations)
Pony-13 League World Series (age 13) (including community teams from other nations)
Bronco League World Series (ages 11–12) (including community teams from other nations)
Bronco-11 League World Series (age 11) (including community teams from other nations)
Mustang League World Series (ages 9–10) (including community teams from other nations)

Reviving Baseball in Inner Cities (RBI) 
 See footnotes
Senior Boys RBI World Series (ages 16–18)
Junior Boys RBI World Series (ages 13–15)

USSSA Baseball 

USSSA Wilson DeMarini Elite World Series:
14U-60/90-BBCOR championship
13U-60/90 championship
12U championship
11U championship
10U championship
9U championship
8U-KP championship

Baseball book of the year 

Casey Award
Dave Moore Award
Jerry Malloy Book Prize (SABR)
Seymour Medal (SABR)

See also 

:Category:Baseball museums and halls of fame
Associated Press Athlete of the Year
Sporting News Sportsman of the Year
Sports Illustrated Sportsman of the Year
Best Female Athlete ESPY Award
Best Male Athlete ESPY Award
Hickok Belt trophy (professional athlete of the year)
Baseball statistics

List of organized baseball leagues
Athlete of the Year
Most Valuable Player
Player of the year award
Rookie of the Year (award)
History of baseball outside the United States

References

External links 
Baseball Awards. Baseball Almanac
Baseball Awards. BaseballChronology.com
Awards and Honors (including "Baseball Award Voting Summaries"). Baseball-Reference.com

Aw
Baseball-related lists